Aleksandra McClain is an archaeologist who specialises in church archaeology and the study of the Middle Ages. She is editor of the journal Medieval Archaeology, and assistant editor of Church Archaeology. McClain joined the University of York, where she is a senior lecturer, in 2008; she completed her doctorate at the same university in 2005.

Selected publications

References 

Living people
Medieval archaeologists
Academics of the University of York
Alumni of the University of York
Year of birth missing (living people)